Cyperus platyphyllus is a species of sedge that is native to southern parts of India and Sri Lanka.

See also 
 List of Cyperus species

References 

platyphyllus
Plants described in 1817
Flora of India
Flora of Sri Lanka
Taxa named by Johann Jacob Roemer
Taxa named by Josef August Schultes